Enrique Eduardo Guillermo Salinas de Gortari (November 15, 1952 – December 6, 2004) was the third of four brothers of former president of Mexico Carlos Salinas.

Death
On December 6, 2004 his corpse was found, with a plastic bag placed over his head, inside a Volkswagen Passat. The vehicle was abandoned in the upmarket municipality of Huixquilucan, Estado de México, on the outskirts of Mexico City. The authorities (PGJEM) gave asphyxiation as the cause of death.

Background
Unlike his brothers ex-president Carlos and convicted felon Raúl, Enrique had eschewed the world of politics in favour of the business sector.

Salinas' widow and kids reside in Lausanne, Switzerland

See also
List of unsolved murders

References

External links
 El Universal 17h01 CST 06.12.04
 El Universal 18h46 CST 06.12.04
 CNN 01h50 GMT 07.12.04

1952 births
2004 deaths
Deaths from asphyxiation
Male murder victims
Mexican murder victims
People murdered in Mexico
Unsolved murders in Mexico